Paul Marcellus Elliott  (born 18 March 1964) is an English former footballer who played as a defender.

Playing career
Starting his career with Charlton Athletic in the early 1980s, Elliott signed for First Division Luton Town in 1983. He then joined Aston Villa in 1985 and spent two years at Italian club Pisa before joining Celtic in 1989. In his final season at Parkhead, Elliott was awarded the Scottish Footballer of the Year award. In the summer of 1991, he signed for Chelsea for £1,400,000.

In September 1992, Elliott sustained a serious knee injury, resulting from a challenge by Liverpool's Dean Saunders. He never played again and on 10 May 1994 – just four days before Chelsea lost to Manchester United in their first FA Cup final since 1970 – Elliott announced his retirement after failing to recover from the injury. Player and club had been confident of a return to action in 1993–94 and he had been issued with the number 22 shirt with the introduction of squad numbers in the FA Premier League.

Just after his retirement, Elliott filed a lawsuit against Saunders seeking damages for the career-ending injury. However, he lost the case when a civil court found that Saunders was not at fault. Elliott was often a pundit on Football Italia.

Post-playing career
In 2003, Elliott was appointed Member of the Order of the British Empire (MBE) for his work with young players and his involvement with anti-racism initiatives in football. He was appointed Commander of the Order of the British Empire (CBE) in the 2012 Birthday Honours for services to equality and diversity in football.

Elliott resigned from his roles with The FA, as a member of the Association's Judicial Panel and as a nominated member of UEFA committees on 23 February 2013. He also left his role at Kick It Out. The FA accepted his resignation following a reported text conversation in which "discriminatory abusive comments" were made to fellow former footballer Richard Rufus. On 15 July 2014, Elliott rejoined the Inclusion Advisory Board.

Elliott was a victim of Rufus's multi-million pound investment fraud, for which Rufus was jailed for seven-and-a-half years in 2023.

Honours
Individual
SPFA Players' Player of the Year: 1990–91
Chelsea F.C. Player of the Year: 1991–92

References

1964 births
Living people
Footballers from Lewisham
Commanders of the Order of the British Empire
English footballers
England B international footballers
England under-21 international footballers
English expatriate footballers
Premier League players
Scottish Football League players
Serie A players
Aston Villa F.C. players
Celtic F.C. players
Charlton Athletic F.C. players
Chelsea F.C. players
Luton Town F.C. players
Pisa S.C. players
Expatriate footballers in Italy
Association football central defenders
English victims of crime